Margaret Bell may refer to:
 Margaret Bell (athlete)
 Margaret Bell (physician)
 Margaret Bell (gymnast)